Lineodes elcodes is a moth in the family Crambidae. It was described by Harrison Gray Dyar Jr. in 1910. It is found in Mexico and the US state of California.

References

Moths described in 1910
Spilomelinae